The 1989 Stella Artois professional tennis tournament was part of the ATP World Tour and was held in Milan, Italy. Boris Becker and Eric Jelen were the defending champions but only Jelen competed in 1989 with Wally Masur. Jelen and Masur lost in the first round to Paolo Canè and Michael Mortensen.

Jakob Hlasek and John McEnroe won in the final 6–3, 6–4 against Heinz Günthardt and Balázs Taróczy.

Seeds
Champion seeds are indicated in bold text while text in italics indicates the round in which those seeds were eliminated.

  Eric Jelen /  Wally Masur (first round)
  Jakob Hlasek /  John McEnroe (champions)
  Patrik Kühnen /  Carl-Uwe Steeb (first round)
  Claudio Mezzadri /  Diego Nargiso (quarterfinals)

Draw

External links
 1989 Stella Artois Indoor Doubles Draw

Milan Indoor
1989 Grand Prix (tennis)
Milan